Philip Wilson (born 31 May 1959) is a British Labour Party politician. He was elected as Member of Parliament (MP) for Sedgefield in a by-election that followed the resignation of Tony Blair, former Prime Minister, from the seat. He lost the seat at the 2019 general election to Paul Howell of the Conservative Party.

Early life and career
The son of a Fishburn colliery worker, Wilson has lived in the Sedgefield constituency all of his life. After attending Trimdon Secondary Modern and Sedgefield Comprehensive School, Wilson became a shop assistant before moving on to be a clerical worker in the civil service where he was a lay-trade union official. Wilson later worked as a gambling lobbyist for the Gala Coral Group in the lead up to the passing of the 2005 Gambling Act, and as a director at London based public affairs consultancy Fellows’ Associates.

Wilson is known for being one of the "Famous Five", a group of local Labour Party members who helped a young Tony Blair get selected as the Labour candidate for Sedgefield for the 1983 general election. He subsequently worked for Tony Blair in his constituency office, the Labour Party and a PR company.

Parliamentary career
Wilson was a Labour Assistant Whip from 2010 to 2015. In 2012, he was elected to the Progress strategy board. In his work for Progress, he was criticised for a blog post that he was accused of plagiarising.

In 2013, a letter attributed to Conservative MP John Glen accused Wilson of failing to properly declare donations from Hitachi before speaking about the matter in a House of Commons debate. Glen subsequently accepted that Wilson was not at fault and apologised personally to him, saying the letter had been drafted on his behalf and he had not read it before it was issued. In his biography on his personal website, Wilson states that bringing a Hitachi Rail factory project to Newton Aycliffe in his constituency represents his "proudest political achievement so far".

In his 2017 general election voter leaflet, Wilson stated he was not a supporter of Labour leader Jeremy Corbyn, and suggested Labour would not win the election. He had supported Owen Smith in the failed attempt to replace Corbyn in the 2016 Labour Party leadership election.

In 2018, Wilson called for a second referendum on Brexit. He said: "Before we retreat to the past, people should be given another chance to decide whether that is where they want to end up". Later he supported the proposal to join the European Economic Area to mitigate the perceived disadvantages of Brexit. Wilson's constituency of Sedgefield voted to Leave the European Union by 59.4%.

References

External links

Personal website

1959 births
Living people
Labour Party (UK) MPs for English constituencies
UK MPs 2005–2010
People from Sedgefield
UK MPs 2010–2015
UK MPs 2015–2017
UK MPs 2017–2019